Trichoceromyia is a genus of midges in the family Cecidomyiidae. There is one described species in this genus: Trichoceromyia oregonensis. It is only known from Oregon.

References

Cecidomyiidae genera

Insects described in 2016
Diptera of North America
Taxa named by Mathias Jaschhof
Taxa named by Scott J. Fitzgerald
Monotypic Diptera genera